Roger Reinson (born April 19, 1969, in Melville, Saskatchewan) is a former Canadian Football League linebacker who played six seasons for the Calgary Stampeders.

Roger Reinson played a major role as a long snapper in the CFL from 1994 till 2005 with the Calgary Stampeders, Edmonton Eskimos and the BC Lions. Reinson played in six Grey Cups and won four with all three teams he played. He played a Grey Cup in every CFL city in Western Canada.

A native of Regina, Reinson works as a police officer in Calgary now that he retired from football.

References

1968 births
Living people
BC Lions players
Calgary Dinos football players
Calgary Stampeders players
Canadian football linebackers
Edmonton Elks players
Players of Canadian football from Saskatchewan